Ehretia laevis is a small tree belonging to the Boraginaceae or borage family.

It is native tree of Asia, and found in China, Bhutan, India, Pakistan, Laos, Myanmar, and Vietnam.

References

Efloraofindia: Ehretia laevis
Ijppsjournal.com: antioxidant capacity
 

laevis
Flora of China
Flora of tropical Asia